In politics, a diet is a formal deliberative assembly. The term is used historically for deliberative assemblies such as the German Imperial Diet (the general assembly of the Imperial Estates of the Holy Roman Empire), as well as a designation for modern-day legislative bodies of certain countries and states such as the National Diet of Japan, or the German Bundestag, the Federal Diet.

Etymology 
The term (also in the nutritional sense) might be derived from Medieval Latin dieta, meaning both "parliamentary assembly" and "daily food allowance", from earlier Latin , possibly from the Greek  (= arbitration), or transcribing Classical Greek  , meaning "way of living", and hence also "diet", "regular (daily) work".

Through a false etymology, reflected in the spelling change replacing ae with e, the word "diet" came to be associated with Latin , "date". It came to be used in postclassical Europe in the sense of "an assembly" because of its use for the work of an assembly meeting on a daily basis or a given day of the time period, and hence for the assembly itself.

Historic uses 
In this sense, it commonly refers to the Imperial Diet assemblies of the Holy Roman Empire:
Imperial Diet 
Diet of Augsburg
Diet of Nuremberg
Diet of Regensburg
Diet of Speyer
Diet of Worms

After the Second Peace of Thorn of 1466, a German-language Prussian diet Landtag was held in the lands of Royal Prussia, a province of Poland in personal union with the king of Poland.

The Diet of Hungary, customarily called together every three years in Székesfehérvár, Buda or Pressburg, was also called "Diéta" in the Habsburg Empire before the 1848 revolution.

The Riksdag of the Estates was the diet of the four estates of Sweden, from the 15th century until 1866. The Diet of Finland was the successor to the Riksdag of the Estates in the Grand Duchy of Finland, from 1809 to 1906.

The Swiss legislature was the  before the Federal Assembly replaced it in the mid-19th century.

Current use 
 The National Diet of Japan, the country's legislative body.
 Some universities in the UK and India refer to the period of formal examination and the conclusion of an academic term as an "examination diet".
Scottish legal procedures include diets of proof, debate, appeal or meeting which may be ordered by a court.

See also

Federal Assembly
Landtag
The Estates (States)
List of legislatures by country
Thing (assembly)
Reichstag (disambiguation)
National Assembly
House of Lords

References

External links

Legislatures